Maciste on Vacation (Italian: Maciste in vacanza) is a 1921 Italian silent adventure film directed by Luigi Romano Borgnetto and starring Bartolomeo Pagano, Henriette Bonard and Gemma De Sanctis. It is part of the series of Maciste films.

Cast
 Bartolomeo Pagano as Maciste 
 Henriette Bonard as Elisa Guappana
 Gemma De Sanctis as la nonna
 Mario Voller-Buzzi as conte Baiardi
 Felice Minotti as Fernando Perez
 Guido De Rege as Dasti, il poeta
 Emilio Vardannes

References

Bibliography
 Roy Kinnard & Tony Crnkovich. Italian Sword and Sandal Films, 1908–1990. McFarland, 2017.

External links

1921 films
1920s Italian-language films
Films directed by Luigi Romano Borgnetto
Italian silent feature films
Italian black-and-white films
1921 adventure films
Italian adventure films
Silent adventure films
1920s Italian films